Microhasarius is a spider genus of the jumping spider family, Salticidae.

Description
Microhasarius have a yellowish-red carapace with a very thin black margin. The cephalus and each side are black with some long whitish-yellow hairs. The abdomen is pale brown with a few dark spots and a dark, median stripe.

Distribution
M. pauperculus is only known from Java, M. animosus only from Sarawak in northern Borneo.

Name
The genus name is combined from "micro" (Greek μικρός for "small") and Hasarius.

Species
 Microhasarius animosus Peckham & Peckham, 1907 — Borneo
 Microhasarius pauperculus Simon, 1902 — Java

Footnotes

References
Simon, E. (1902) Description d'arachnides nouveaux de la famille des Salticidae (Attidae) (suite), Ann. Soc. ent. Belg., 46, p. 395
Peckham, G. and Peckham, E. G. (1907) The Attidae of Borneo, Trans. Wiscons. Ac. Sci. Arts Let., '15, p. 608
Proszynski, J. (1997) Genus Microhasarius (Simon, 1902), Salticidae: Diagnostic Drawings Library, www site, accessed 15 June 2007
  (2000): An Introduction to the Spiders of South East Asia. Malaysian Nature Society, Kuala Lumpur.
  (2007): The world spider catalog, version 8.0. American Museum of Natural History.

Salticidae
Spiders of Asia
Salticidae genera
Taxa named by Eugène Simon